PNE Garden Auditorium is a multi-purpose indoor arena in Vancouver, Canada, located on the grounds of the Pacific National Exhibition. It was built in 1940. From the mid-1950s until 1980, it was a very popular concert venue, hosting artists such as The Police, Tom Petty, Meat Loaf, Blondie, Rush, Heart, Lynyrd Skynyrd, Kiss, Fleetwood Mac, Pink Floyd, The Kinks and Little Richard. A Grateful Dead live album, July 29 1966, P.N.E. Garden Aud., Vancouver Canada, was recorded at the auditorium.

References

External links
PNE Garden Auditorium information

Indoor arenas in British Columbia